Natalia Clovis (born July 13, 1943) is an American fencer and artist. She competed in the women's team foil event at the 1972 Summer Olympics. She became an artist after working in banking for 25 years. She studied in Europe and also worked with American sculptor Tony Lopez. She resides in Tucson, Arizona.

References

External links
 

1943 births
Living people
American female foil fencers
Olympic fencers of the United States
Fencers at the 1972 Summer Olympics
Sportspeople from Havana
American women sculptors
Artists from Tucson, Arizona
Sculptors from Arizona
21st-century American women artists